Robert Nelson White (11 August 1902 – 1977) was an English footballer who played in the Football League for Carlisle United, Tranmere Rovers, Watford, Wolverhampton Wanderers and Stoke.

Career
White was born in Walbottle and began his career with amateur side Prudhoe Celtic before joining Huddersfield Town in 1923. He failed to make an appearance for Huddersfield and left for Stoke in 1924. He spent the 1924–25 at Stoke making just three appearances for the club in February 1925. With White's career looking as if it would fade away he converted to an out and out striker and signed for Tranmere Rovers and scored 13 goals in 1925–26. A poor 1926–27 saw him leave for non-league Yeovil & Petters United where he spent four years before returning to Football League action with Wolverhampton Wanderers. He played three matches for Wolves and scored twice in a Black Country derby match against West Bromwich Albion, although the match ended in a 7–3 victory for the "Baggies". White then joined Watford where he enjoyed the best spell of his career scoring an impressive 21 goals in 24 matches in two seasons. He then joined Portsmouth where he failed to settle and ended his career at Carlisle United.

Career statistics
Source:

References

English footballers
Carlisle United F.C. players
Portsmouth F.C. players
Stoke City F.C. players
Huddersfield Town A.F.C. players
Tranmere Rovers F.C. players
Yeovil Town F.C. players
Watford F.C. players
Wolverhampton Wanderers F.C. players
English Football League players
1902 births
1977 deaths
Association football forwards